Jon Servold (born 27 November 1960) is a Canadian skier. He competed in the Nordic combined event at the 1988 Winter Olympics.

References

External links
 

1960 births
Living people
Canadian male Nordic combined skiers
Olympic Nordic combined skiers of Canada
Nordic combined skiers at the 1988 Winter Olympics
People from Camrose, Alberta
Sportspeople from Alberta